Eva Fiesel, née Lehmann (born 23 December 1891 in Rostock; died 27 May 1937 in New York), was a German linguist and scholar of Etruscan.

Life
Her father Karl Lehmann was Professor of Law and Rector of the University of Rostock from 1904 to 1905, and from 1911 in Göttingen. Her mother was the painter Henni Lehmann, and her brother Karl Leo Heinrich Lehmann became a well-known archaeologist. In 1915 she married Ludolf Fiesel, a lecturer at Rostock, in Göttingen. In the winter semester of 1916–17 she enrolled at the University of Rostock. 

She received her PhD in 1920 from University of Rostock on the subject of grammatical gender in Etruscan, supervised by Gustav Herbig. Fiesel divorced in 1926 and subsequently raised her children as a single mother. From 1931 to 1933, Fiesel taught as a private lecturer (Privatdozentin) at the University of Munich. In July 1933, despite protests, she lost her position there because she was a Jew by birth.

After a long research stay in Florence with Giorgio Pasquali, she emigrated to the US with her thirteen-year-old daughter Ruth in 1934, one year before her brother Karl, at the invitation of linguist Edgar Howard Sturtevant. She taught as a research assistant at Yale University, where at the time she was the only woman to hold such a role; later she was appointed visiting professor at Bryn Mawr College, Pennsylvania, an all-female, private residential College. She died at the age of 46 of liver cancer, only months after the death of her mother. [302]

Works
 Fiesel, Eva. 1927. Die Sprachphilosophie der deutschen Romantiker [Philosophy of language of the German Romantics]. Tübingen: J. C. B. Mohr.
 Fiesel, Eva. 1931. Etruskisch [Etruscan]. Berlin/Leipzig: Walter de Gruyter.
 Fiesel, Eva. 1936. X presents a Sibilant in Early Etruscan. American Journal of Philology 57, 261–270.

References

Linguists from Germany
Linguists of Etruscan
German Jews
Bryn Mawr College faculty
1891 births
1937 deaths
Jewish emigrants from Nazi Germany to the United States
Jewish emigrants from Nazi Germany to Italy
Jewish non-fiction writers
Jewish women writers
20th-century German women writers
20th-century German non-fiction writers
Women linguists